The Bützistock is a mountain of the Glarus Alps. It lies on the border between the cantons of Glarus and St. Gallen in Eastern Switzerland. The top is 2,496 m (8,189 ft) above sea level or 513 meters above the surrounding terrain. The width at the base is 18 km.

The terrain around Bützistock is mainly mountainous, but the nearest surrounding area is hilly. The highest point nearby is Piz Sardona, 3,056 meters (roughly 10,026 ft) above sea level, 13 km (roughly 8.1 miles) south of Bützistock. The closest locality is Engi on the southern side.

The area around Bützistock consists mainly of grassland. Around Bützistock, it is quite sparsely populated, with 38 inhabitants per square kilometer. Tundra climate prevails in the area. The annual average temperature in the area is -1 °C (30.2 °F). The warmest month is July, when the average temperature is 10 °C (50 °F), and the coldest is January, with -12 °C (10.4 °F). The average annual precipitation for the area is 1,929 mm (roughly 76 in). The rainiest month is November, with an average rainfall of 246 mm (roughly 9.7 in), and the driest is March, with 78 mm (roughly 3.1 in).

References

External links
 Bützistock on Hikr

Mountains of the Alps
Mountains of Switzerland
Mountains of the canton of St. Gallen
Mountains of the canton of Glarus
Glarus–St. Gallen border
Two-thousanders of Switzerland